Wolfgang Puschnig (born 21 May 1956 in Klagenfurt, Austria) is an Austrian jazz musician (saxophone, flute, bass clarinet) and composer.

Biography 
After his studies of saxophone and flute at the Vienna Conservatory Puschnig was the founding member of the Vienna Art Orchestra together with Mathias Rüegg in the mid-1970s. Here he was active until 1989. He was also involved in projects with Ernst Jandl involving Lauren Newton. He also played with Hans Koller in the early 1980s, with the quartet 'Air Mail' and 'Saxofour'. Carla Bley brought him into her groups in the mid 1980s. He worked with Wolfgang Mitterer, Uli Scherer, and his longtime partner Linda Sharrock and Jamaaladeen Tacuma in different groups, and also has cooperated with Reinhard Flatischler, Herbert Joos, Christof Lauer, and Michel Godard. In the project "Alpine Aspects" he started in 1991 with jazz musicians and the Amstetten musicians together (most recently at the JazzFest Berlin  2006 and at Musikfest Waidhofen / Thaya 2007). In addition, he has repeatedly performed with the Korean percussion ensemble SamulNori.

Puschnig is Professor at the University of Music and Performing Arts Vienna and former Head of the Department of Popular Music.

Honors (selection) 
 1998: Hans Koller Prize as "Jazz Musician of the Year"
 2003: Recognition Award of Carinthia
 2004: The first musician to receive an honorary doctorate from the University of Klagenfurt
 2016: Officer's Cross of the State of Carinthia's Order of Merit (Großes Ehrenzeichen des Landes Kärnten)
 2022: Cultural Prize of Carinthia (Kulturpreis des Landes Kärnten)

Discography

Solo albums 
 1988: Pieces Of The Dream (Amadeo)
 1991: Alpine Aspects (Amadeo)
 1995: Mixed Metaphors (Amadeo)
 1997: Dream Weavers (Label Hopi)
 1998: Roots & Fruits (EmArcy)
 1999: Aspects (Pao Records)
 2001: Chants (Quinton Records)
 2006: Things Change: The 50th Anniversary Box (EmArcy), 3xCD

Collaborations 
With Ernst Jandl
 1984: Bist Eulen? (Extraplatte)
 1988: Vom Vom Zum Zum (Extraplatte)

With 'Air Mail' (Harry Pepl, Mike Richmond, Wolfgang Puschnig, Wolfgang Reisinger)
 1985: Prayer For Peace (Moers Music)
 1988: Light Blues (Amadeo, LP)
 2001: Light Blues (EmArcy, CD)

With 'AM 4' (Wolfgang Puschnig / Linda Sharrock / Uli Scherer)
 1989: ... And She Answered: (ECM Records)

With Red Sun Samulnori (Choi Jong Sil, Kang Min Seok, Kim Duk-Soo, Lee Kwang Soo)
 1989: Red Sun Samulnori (Amadeo)
 1994: Then Comes The White Tiger (ECM Records)
 1995: Nanjang - A new Horizon (Amadeo, Antilles)

With Carla Bley
 1991: The Very Big Carla Bley Band (WATT Works)
 1996: The Carla Bley Big Band Goes to Church (WATT Works)
 2000: 4x4 (WATT Works)
 2003: Looking for America (WATT Works)
 2008: Appearing Nightly (WATT Works)

With Paul Urbanek and Hans Koller
 2000: The Hans Koller Concept (Extraplatte)
 2002: The Hans Koller Concept 2 (Extraplatte)
With the Vienna Art Orchestra
Tango from Obango (Art, 1980)
Concerto Piccolo (Hat ART, 1981)
Suite for the Green Eighties (Hat ART, 1982)
From No Time to Rag Time (Hat ART, 1983)
The Minimalism of Erik Satie (Hat ART, 1984)
A Notion in Perpetual Motion (Hat ART, 1985)
With other projects
 1986: Obsoderso (Moers Music), as Wolfgang Puschnig / Wolfgang Mitterer
 1986: Pat Brothers No. 1. (Moers Music), with The Pat Brothers (Wolfgang Mitterer, Wolfgang Puschnig)
 1988: Two Songs For Another Lovely War (Ex Zed Records), as Wolfgang Puschnig / Christian Radovan / Wolfgang Reisinger / Uli Scherer / Heiri Kaenzig / Harry Sokal / Mathias Rüegg
 1998: Holy Aureols Esoteric (Esovision), as Wolfgang Puschnig and Stefan Benkö
 1998: Spaces (EmArcy), as Wolfgang Puschnig • Mark Feldman
 1998: hot ROOM (Extraplatte), as Lechner / Puschnig / Tang / Youssef
 2000: Almost Blue (EmArcy), with Willi Resetarits
 2002: Grey (Quinton Records), as Wolfgang Puschnig | Steve Swallow | Don Alias | Victor Lewis
 2002: Red - White - Red & Spangled (Universal Music Austria), with Harry Sokal
 2005: Odem (EmArcy), as Wolfgang Puschnig, Jatinder Thakur, Dhafer Youssef
 2005: Color Fields (Unit Records), as Newton - Huber - Puschnig
 2005: Voices Of Time (Universal Music Austria), with Harry Sokal
 2007: Late Night Show Part II (Quinton Records), as Puschnig / Sharrock
 2008: Gemini Gemini (ITM ARCHIVES, 2xCD), with Jamaaladeen Tacuma
 2008: Alpine Aspects - Homage To O.C. (EmArcy), as Wolfgang Puschnig | Robert Pussecker
 2010: Terra (Leo Records), with Sainkho Namtchylak
 2011: Berühren (PAN TAU-X Records), with Triomobile (Ponger, Roder, Soyka, Puschnig)
 2014: The Jazz Composer's Orchestra Update (ECM Records), with Michael Mantler

References

External links 
 
 Wolfgang Puschnig in SR-Archiv österreichischer Popularmusik

1956 births
Living people
Musicians from Klagenfurt
Avant-garde jazz musicians
EmArcy Records artists
ECM Records artists
20th-century saxophonists
21st-century saxophonists
Austrian jazz musicians
Jazz flautists
Austrian jazz composers
Male jazz composers
20th-century male musicians
21st-century male musicians
Vienna Art Orchestra members
20th-century flautists
21st-century flautists